Viktor Ivanovich Borodachev (Russian: Виктор Иванович Бородачёв; 23 August 1918 - 11 July 1968) was a Soviet Air Force Major general, World War II flying ace and Hero of the Soviet Union.

References 

1918 births
1968 deaths
Heroes of the Soviet Union
Russian aviators
Soviet World War II flying aces
Recipients of the Order of Lenin
Recipients of the Order of the Red Banner
Recipients of the Order of Alexander Nevsky
Recipients of the Medal "For Courage" (Russia)
Military Academy of the General Staff of the Armed Forces of the Soviet Union alumni